U.S. Air Force aeronautical ratings are military aviation skill standards established and awarded by the United States Air Force for commissioned officers participating in "regular and frequent flight", either aerially or in space, in performance of their duties. USAF aeronautical badges, commonly referred to as "wings" from their shape and their historical legacy, are awarded by the Air Force in recognition of degrees of achievement and experience. Officers earning these badges and maintaining their requirements are classified as rated officers and receive additional pay and allowances.

The first U.S. military aviator ratings were awarded in 1912, and the issuance of badges for recognition of the award began in 1913. The division of ratings into multiple skill levels and categories began in 1914 and expanded during World War I. With minor variations in numbers and titles of ratings, the system remained largely unchanged until 1940, when the current system of pilot ratings was introduced. During World War II, as many as 19 aeronautical ratings were recognized and awarded by the Army Air Forces, but most were discontinued after the war when the USAF came into being.

USAF ratings gradually expanded until seven categories and 21 ratings exist currently. The most recent change added the RPA (Remotely Piloted Aircraft) Pilot rating, effective 13 December 2010. Although in much smaller numbers, enlisted personnel were historically eligible to be rated until 1949. Since the later 1950s, highly trained enlisted personnel, along with officers whose duties do not include flying, are recognized by the awarding of Air Force Occupational Badges.  In 2016, the Air Force opened RPA pilot positions to enlisted personnel, making them the first enlisted pilots since 1949.

Overview
For all categories of aeronautical ratings, to be eligible for the rating and to wear the appropriate badge, an officer must be medically qualified to fly and also be qualified by flying status proficiency. Certified flight officers who develop medical conditions that disqualify them from flying are classified DNIF (Duties Not Including Flying).  DNIF may be temporary or permanent.  Officers placed on permanent DNIF status are either cross-trained into another career field, or separated from the Air Force, depending on the severity of their medical condition.

The Astronaut "qualifier" is awarded only by the Air Force Chief of Staff for rated officers formally qualified to perform duties at least 50 miles above the earth's surface and who have participated in at least one operational mission, and has a distinctive Astronaut Badge, consisting of a "shooting star" qualifier device superimposed on their rated badge.

The seven categories of aeronautical ratings, as authorized by Title 10, U.S.C. 8691, are:
 Pilot: awarded by the Commander or delegated wing commanders, Air Education and Training Command (AETC)
 Navigator: awarded by the Commander or delegated wing commanders, AETC
 Combat System Officer (CSO): awarded by the Commander or delegated wing commanders, AETC
 Air Battle Manager (ABM): awarded by the Commander or delegated air control wing commanders, AETC
 RPA Pilot: awarded by the Commander or delegated wing commanders, Air Combat Command, or Commander, Air Force Reserve Command
 Observer: awarded by the Senior Air Force Officer, National Aeronautics and Space Administration.  Badge is identical to that worn by USAF Navigators and CSOs.  In current practice, is awarded with the Astronaut distinguishing insignia to those USAF officer astronauts who are not previously rated USAF Pilots or USAF Navigators/CSOs.  Although identical to the badge worn by Navigators and CSOs, recipients are not graduates of USAF Navigator or CSO training.
 Flight Surgeon: awarded by the Commander, USAF School of Aerospace Medicine

Evolution of the USAF ratings system

From the Aviation Act (40 Stat. 243), 24 July 1917:

That officers detailed in or attached to the aviation section of the signal corps may, when qualified therefore, be rated as junior military aviator, military aviator, junior military aeronaut, and military aeronaut ... Provided further, that any officer attached to the aviation section of the signal corps for any military duty requiring him to make regular and frequent flights shall receive an increase of 25 per centum of the pay of his grade and length of service under his commission.

Civil ratings
Aeronautical ratings were established on 23 February 1912, by War Department Bulletin No. 6, as a new measurement of pilot skill. Before that time most pilots of the Aeronautical Division, Signal Corps soloed by the "short hop method" (also known as "grass-cutting"), in which student pilots, flying alone, learned to handle airplane controls on the ground, taxied in further practice until just short of takeoff speeds, and finally took off to a height of just ten feet, gradually working up to higher altitudes and turns. The practice resulted in the first pilot death only a month into training. At least three of these pilots had been previously instructed by Glenn Curtiss at North Island field, California. Concurrently, two pilots (future General of the Air Force Henry H. Arnold and Thomas DeWitt Milling) were instructed by the Wright Brothers and certified by the Fédération Aéronautique Internationale (FAI) in July 1911.

Military Aviator
To establish formal standards of certification, the Army created the Military Aviator rating and published requirements on 20 April 1912.  The first rating was awarded to Henry H. Arnold on 5 July 1912. The first rating requirements were:
Attain an altitude of at least 2,500 feet;
Pilot an aircraft for at least five minutes in a wind of 15 m.p.h. velocity or greater;
Carry a passenger to an altitude of 500 feet, with a combined weight of pilot and passenger of 250 pounds or more, and make a deadstick landing to within 150 feet of a designated point; and
Make a military reconnaissance flight of at least 20 miles cross-country at an average altitude of 1,500 feet.

 
War Department General Order No. 39, dated 27 May 1913, certified 24 officers including Arnold as "qualified", and authorized issuance of a certificate and badge. A number of designs for the badge were considered before the War Department chose that of an eagle holding Signal Corps flags in its talons, suspended from a bar embossed with "Military Aviator", and had the dies manufactured. A group of 14 aviators still detailed to the Signal Corps was recommended on 29 September 1913 to receive the badge, and the two gold proofs were issued 16 October 1913, to Captain Charles DeF. Chandler and Lt. Thomas D. Milling, both of whom had also received the first ratings with Arnold on 5 July 1912. All 24 officers certified by G.O. 39, or their survivors, were eventually issued the badge.

Two levels of qualification were specified in War Department Bulletin No. 35 on 4 May 1914, with aviators below the rank of captain to be rated as Junior Military Aviator and those captain and above to be rated as Military Aviator. Similar ratings were created for the lighter-than-air branch of aviation, termed Military Aeronaut.  On 18 July 1914, Congress established the Aviation Section, Signal Corps, incorporating, expanding and superseding the Aeronautical Division, and established in law both flight pay ( called the "aviation increase") and the awarding of ratings. The Act of 1914 authorized an aviation increase of 25% in pay to student pilots, 50% to those rated JMA, and 75% to those rated MA. Rated lieutenants who flew "regularly and frequently" were given the temporary rank, pay, and allowances of the next higher grade.

Because a provision also required three years' experience as a JMA in order to become eligible to be rated MA, all remaining Military Aviators had their ratings changed to JMA. None re-acquired the rating (and its "aviation increase") before July 1917. The National Defense Act of 1916 eliminated pilot age and rank eligibility restrictions and allowed captains to also draw the temporary rank, pay, and allowances of the next higher grade if required to participate in regular and frequent flight.

World War I and Air Service revisions

The Military Aviator badge was superseded on 15 August 1917 by authorization of a new embroidered "wings" badge, the first sketches of which are attributed to Arnold. A new rating, Reserve Military Aviator, was authorized on 3 June 1917 to rate pilots during World War I, with all ranks and grades being temporary. The Aviation Act of 24 July 1917 authorized those holding a pre-war JMA rating to advance to MA rating by the three-year rule, and along with RMA holders, by "distinguished service." A wartime Reserve Military Aeronaut rating for balloon pilots was also created, as was a rating of Observer for both airplanes and balloons, bringing the total number of aeronautical ratings to seven.

After the creation by executive order in 1918 of the Army Air Service, a standard wings-and-shield design for the rating badge, still in use today, was created by sculptor Herbert S. Adams of the United States Commission of Fine Arts and approved on 25 January 1919. Army regulations regarding ratings underwent a major revision by the Director of Air Service on 16 October 1919, when the RMA rating was officially changed to Airplane Pilot (although usage of the RMA terminology continued until 1920), all observers were termed Aerial Observer, and new ratings of Enlisted Pilot, Airship Pilot, Aerial Gunner, and Aerial Bomber were created. Among the new ratings, a 50% aviation increase was authorized for the enlisted pilot and 25% for all the others. The new ratings, however, proved to be only a demobilization expedient and lasted less than nine months.

In 1920, when the Air Service was made a statutory arm of the line, the National Defense Act of 1920 also ended the differentials in flight pay and standardized it at 50%. The policy of awarding rated officers a temporary advancement in grade was also terminated. To qualify for command of a unit, an officer was required by law to be rated. The existing ratings were reduced to four on 10 August 1920, combining the ratings of Reserve Military Aviator/Airplane Pilot, Junior Military Aviator, and Military Aviator into the rating of Airplane Pilot and Military Aeronaut and Balloon Observer into the rating of Balloon Observer, renaming the rating of Aerial Observer as Airplane Observer, and continuing the rating of Airship Pilot. All those already holding the old ratings qualified automatically for the new. In 1921 the Air Service authorized the wearing of 3.125-inch ratings badges made of oxidized silver in lieu of embroidered badges.

In 1921 the Air Service also revised its pilot training program, adopting the "A Plan", which divided pilot ratings between Junior Airplane Pilot (completion of primary training, normally an enlisted rating) and Airplane Pilot (completion of advanced training). The bulk of new pilots were acquired from the enlisted classification of "flying cadet", with achievement of a JAP rating making a cadet eligible for advanced pilot training and commissioning. However, some older Air Service officers without flying experience, but requiring a rating to remain in the Air Service, acquired a JAP rating, including Chief of Air Service Maj. Gen. Mason Patrick.

In 1924 the Tenth Annual Report of the National Advisory Committee for Aeronautics, submitted by President Calvin Coolidge to the Congress, reported:

The Air Service has 845 officers with rating as airplane pilots, airplane observers, airship pilots, airship observers, or balloon observers. In addition about 51 enlisted men have the rating of airplane pilot, junior airplane pilot, or airship pilot.

Air Corps, World War II, Cold War and Post-Cold War changes
In 1926, the new Air Corps discarded the A Plan in favor of the B Plan, which awarded only a single rating, Airplane Pilot, requiring completion of all phases of a year-long, three-school (Primary, Basic, and Advanced) flying training course. The Airship School closed in 1928 for economic reasons, ending all increases and replacements in airship ratings. The Air Corps Act of 1926 mandated that 90% of all Air Corps officers be rated, and that for reasons of economy, by 1929 at least 20% of tactical pilots had to be enlisted men. However, the latter requirement was so utterly impractical it was circumvented by the Air Corps with the tacit approval of the War Department. The Air Corps had only 38 rated enlisted men in 1930 (about 4% of all pilots), and nearly every enlisted graduate was being commissioned to decrease deficits in rated officers. Those remaining as enlisted men in the Regular Army held reserve officer commissions in the event of war.

In 1936, Maj. Gen. Frank M. Andrews, commanding the GHQ Air Force, promulgated a policy requiring newly minted pilots to spend a year flying single-engined aircraft and accruing 750 logged flight hours as a prerequisite to becoming a bomber pilot. Seven years of military flying experience and 2,000 logged hours qualified a pilot as an "airplane commander" in the GHQAF. In 1937 the Army formalized the requirement, creating a new advanced rating of Military Airplane Pilot, setting 12 years as a rated pilot and 2,000 hours of flight time as the standard. The rating of Airship Pilot was discontinued at the same time and that of Airship Observer incorporated into Balloon Observer, leaving the Air Corps with five ratings.

Between November 1939 and March 1940 pilot ratings were revised to the permanent three-tier system with objective standards that exists today, with a total of eight ratings overall. Graduation from Advanced Flying School was required to be rated a Pilot; ten years service and 1,800 hours of military flight for Senior Pilot rating; and either 15 years service with 3,000 hours, or 20 years service with 2,000 hours, to become a Command Pilot. For both advanced ratings, hours as a pilot or navigator (a specialization then performed only by rated pilots) were calculated at 100%, but military flight hours in any other capacity were calculated at a 50% rate. The Air Corps also divided the former Airplane Observer rating into that of Combat Observer and Technical Observer.

Navigator was recognized by the United States Army Air Forces as a rating and authorized its own badge on 4 September 1942, one of a number of new wartime ratings that included Bombardier, the Glider Pilot, Liaison Pilot and Service Pilot ratings (N.B.: these three ratings were typically awarded to soldiers on the basis of prior civilian flying experience, with a higher age limit and relaxed medical requirements for entry vs. the normal Pilot training pipeline; their duty assignments were limited in scope), and enlisted Aircrew ratings. Combat Observer was renamed Aircraft Observer. All of the wartime ratings except Navigator were discontinued by the USAF on 26 July 1949, with Navigator and Bombardier merged into a single Navigator rating and the badge design being changed in 1951 from that of an armillary sphere flanked by wings to that of the USAF shield flanked by wings.  At this time, a tiered system of ratings based on hours and years of service was also implemented with Senior Navigator and Master Navigator following the same precepts as Senior Pilot and Command Pilot.

Beginning in 2011, the rating of Navigator was retitled, replaced by the aeronautical rating of Combat Systems Officer (CSO), with the same badge insignia as Navigator.  This title change was intended to place the CSO more in line with their Naval Flight Officer (NFO) counterparts of the U.S. Navy and U.S. Marine Corps, especially since the latter have historically enjoyed more robust operational flying command and major command opportunities, to include promotion to 3-star and 4-star rank.  Although observer ratings were also discontinued by USAF in 1949, the Observer title was revived in 1981 when a rating was created for otherwise non-aeronautically rated USAF officers who completed NASA mission specialist astronaut training and subsequently flew in space.

Flight Surgeons were rated and received the "aviation increase" between 1918 and 1920. The rating was discontinued in 1920, however, and flight surgeons as a military profession were neglected by the headquarters of the successive Army air arms until late in 1939. In July 1940, the recommendations of a board of flight surgeons appointed by Gen. Arnold were adopted, standardizing ratings requirements as:

 graduation from a Class A medical school,
 completion of a one-year rotational internship,
 completion of the School of Aviation Medicine course,
 one year's service in the AAF as an Aviation Medical Examiner, and
 50 hours of logged military flight.

The Flight Surgeon rating received its own distinctive gold badge on 3 March 1942, which was changed to the standard oxidized silver wings in 1944 to avoid confusion with naval aviator badges.

USAF rating requirements

Pilot ratings

The USAF awards pilot ratings at three levels: Pilot, Senior Pilot, and Command Pilot, to active duty officers and to officers considered as "rated assets" in the Air Force Reserve and Air National Guard (i.e., the Air Reserve Components). Rating standards apply equally to both fixed-wing and helicopter pilots.

The following additional criteria are required to be rated as a USAF Pilot:

RPA Pilot ratings

The USAF awards remotely piloted aircraft (RPA) pilot ratings at three levels: RPA Pilot, Senior RPA Pilot, and Command RPA Pilot, to active duty officers, to enlisted personnel, and to officers considered as "rated assets" in the Air Reserve Components.

The following additional criteria are required to be rated as a USAF remotely piloted aircraft pilot:

Combat System Officer ratings

The Combat System Officer (CSO) rating is awarded to individuals who entered the CSO Undergraduate Flying Training after 1 October 2004. The USAF awards combat system officer ratings at three levels: Combat System Officer, Senior Combat System Officer, and Master Combat System Officer, for active duty officers and officers considered rated assets in the Air Reserve Components. The insignia is identical to USAF Navigator, but rated navigators who are not CSO rated are not eligible for award of advanced CSO ratings. The following additional criteria are required for rating as a USAF Combat System Officer:

Navigator ratings

The USAF awards navigator ratings at three levels: Navigator, Senior Navigator, and Master Navigator, for active duty officers and officers considered "rated assets" in the Air Reserve Components. After 2009 only Combat System Operators receive ratings formerly awarded to navigators, as the occupational field is being phased out. The following additional criteria are required for rating as a USAF Navigator:

Air Battle Manager ratings

The USAF awards Air Battle Manager ratings at three levels: Air Battle Manager, Senior Air Battle Manager, and Master Air Battle Manager, for active duty officers and officers considered "rated assets" in the Air Reserve Components. The following additional criteria are required to be rated as a USAF Air Battle Manager:

Observer ratings

The USAF awards observer ratings at three levels: Observer, Senior Observer, and Master Observer, for active duty officers and officers considered "rated assets" in the Air Reserve Components. The insignia is identical to USAF Navigator/CSO and is typically only awarded as an "observer" insignia with the Astronaut emblem to USAF officers who have completed training as NASA Mission Specialist Astronauts, have flown at least once in space in the Space Shuttle and/or served at the International Space Station, and are not otherwise rated as USAF Pilots or USAF Navigators/CSOs.  The following additional criteria are required to be rated as a USAF Observer:

Flight Surgeon ratings

The USAF awards flight surgeon ratings at three levels: Flight Surgeon, Senior Flight Surgeon, and Chief Flight Surgeon, for active duty officers and officers considered "rated assets" in the Air Reserve Components. The following additional criteria are required for rating as a USAF Flight Surgeon:

Pilot-Physicians
Flight surgeons may also perform duties as Pilot-Physicians (Air Force Specialty Code 48VX). The purpose of pilot-physicians is to provide "integrated operational and aerospace medicine guidance" in the research, development, testing, and evaluation of Air Force systems and missions to realize the greatest effectiveness and cost savings.

Pilot-physicians were previously assigned only to an operational flying squadron in their respective aircraft, with their main assignment as a pilot, but also with clinical duties seeing patients, usually the flight medicine clinic, depending on the pilot-physician's medical specialty. On 21 April 2011 the Pilot-Physician Program (PPP) was completely revised to make "the most of the special resources of Air Force officers who are simultaneously qualified both as pilots and flight surgeons," with a senior pilot-physician selected by the Air Force Surgeon General to be Program Director, and assignment of designated command, staff, research, training, and education billets as well as duty in operational units. A P48VX specialty code is assigned to those on aeronautical orders as a pilot-physician and assigned to one of these designated PPP billets. Pilot-Physicians are entitled to conditional flight pay (ACIP), that is, only if assigned to an active flying position and flying a prescribed number of hours monthly.

In addition to being a rated pilot and a rated flight surgeon, a pilot-physician must have completed at least three years of operational flying and one year as an operational flight surgeon, with a provision for assigning applicants without flight surgeon operational experience to a base where they would likely become a "first assignment pilot-physician". The revised program allows flight surgeons access to undergraduate pilot training and remotely piloted aircraft (RPA) pilot training (one slot per year); allows participation of flight surgeons with experience as navigators, electronic warfare officers, RPA sensor operators, and flight test engineers as navigator-physicians or flight test-physicians; and authorizes pilot-physicians to compete for assignment to USAF Test Pilot School.

Pilot-physicians are defined by four core competencies to achieve program objectives: 
Providing expert guidance through the synthesis of operational and medical experience,
Conducting research by applying operational insights to studies; basic and applied science; relevant research, development, test & evaluation (RDT&E); and operational test & evaluation (OT&E),
Teaching aircrew, senior Air Force leaders, and medical personnel on subjects of particular expertise, and
Conducting analysis to provide recommendations for operational systems, environments, and mishaps; and solutions to human performance problems.

Pilot-physicians are eligible for advanced ratings as both flight surgeons and pilots. They may apply toward advanced pilot ratings any USAF pilot years of aviation service, months of operational flying duty, and total flying hours accrued before achieving flight surgeon status. After attaining status as a pilot-physician, all hours flown as a pilot, and months of operational flying duty credit accrued as a pilot, are "dual-credited" toward both advanced pilot and flight surgeon ratings as long as the officer is on aeronautical orders as an active pilot-physician.

See also
 Badges of the United States Air Force
 Military badges of the United States
 Obsolete badges of the United States military

Notes
Footnotes

Citations

References
 AFI 11-402, Aviation and Parachutist Service, Aeronautical Ratings and Badges, 13 December 2010; certified current 5 February 2013
 AFI 11-405 The Pilot-Physician Program, 21 April 2011
 AFI 11-401 Aviation Management, 10 December 2010; certified current 9 January 2013
Aviation Medicine in the A.E.F., Office of the Director of Air Service, February 1920, U.S. Government Printing Office
 Callander, Bruce D. "They Wanted Wings", AIR FORCE Magazine, January 1991, Vol. 74, No. 1, the Air Force Association, Arlington, Virginia
 Correll, John T. "The First of the Force," AIR FORCE Magazine, August 2007, Vol. 90, No. 8, the Air Force Association, Arlington, Virginia
Craven, Wesley Frank, and Cate, James Lea, editors (1958). "The Medical Service of the USAAF" (LeRoy, Dr. George V.), Volume Seven – Services Around the World, The Army Air Forces in World War II, Air Force Historical Studies Office

Hennessy, Dr. Juliette A. (1958). The United States Army Air Arm, April 1861 to April 1917 (USAF Historical Study No. 98), Maxwell Air Force Base: Air Force Historical Research Agency,  OCLC 12553968
Hussey, Anne, and Browning, Dr. Robert (2000). "Flying Training at Kelly, 1917–1943", A History of Military Aviation in San Antonio, USAF Air Education and Training Command
Jones, David R. (2003). Flight Surgeon Support to United States Air Force Fliers in Combat, USAF School of Aerospace Medicine, Brooks City-Base, Texas
Maurer, Maurer (1987). Aviation in the U.S. Army, 1919–1939, Office of Air Force History, Washington, D.C. 
Manufacturers Aircraft Association, Inc. (1920). Aircraft Year Book, Doubleday, Page, and Company. New York
Rottman, Gordon L. (2002). U.S. Army Air Forces, Volume Two, Osprey Publishing, Botley, Oxford, UK. 
 History: The 1913 Military Aviator's Badge awarded to Captain Paul W. Beck, U.S. Infantry, by Walter Schott The Early Birds of Aviation, Inc.

United States Air Force
Awards and decorations of the United States Air Force